Steven Universe The Movie (Original Soundtrack) is the soundtrack to the 2019 television film Steven Universe: The Movie, based on the Cartoon Network animated television series Steven Universe. The soundtrack was released on September 1, 2019 by WaterTower Music ahead of the film's television premiere, and features 38 songs performed by the cast members, and Patti LuPone, Chance the Rapper, Aimee Mann, James Fauntleroy, Gallant, Ted Leo, Mike Krol, Grant Henry amongst several others. It also accompanied by original score composed by Aivi & Surasshu, who worked on the series. The deluxe edition of the album (featuring demo versions of a few songs) was released on November 15, and both editions were also released on vinyl.

Singles 
The first single from the film's soundtrack, "True Kinda Love", performed by Estelle and Callison, was released on July 19, 2019. "Other Friends", another track from the film was released on October 18, 2019, including Spanish and Portuguese versions of the song, performed by Dorisvell Costa and Vic Brow, respectively.

Track listing 
Track listing and credits adapted from Apple Music and Tidal.

Charts

Release history

References 

2019 soundtrack albums
Steven Universe
Children's albums
Rock soundtracks
Pop soundtracks
Soul soundtracks
Funk soundtracks
Contemporary R&B soundtracks
Cartoon Network albums
WaterTower Music soundtracks